USAAF Mustang is a horizontally scrolling shooter arcade game originally developed by NMK, and published by UPL in 1990. It was ported a year later to the Mega Drive by Taito, while being renamed Fire Mustang. NMK Co. Ltd. also developed the Mega Drive version.

There is only one type of available weapon and a bomb weapon. Players took on a fictional campaign in a World War II setting as a USAAF fighter pilot in a titular North American P-51 Mustang against the Nazi Luftwaffe and the Imperial Japanese Navy Air Service.

The arcade version was released on the PlayStation 4 and Nintendo Switch in 2021 as part of the Arcade Archives series, marking its first official release in the west.

Gameplay
Players were sent around stages in Europe and Asia against either of the two featured Axis powers. Every level was filled with a wide variety of different fighter craft and ground forces that all preceded the end-level boss (generally a large aircraft). Eight levels in all; the game repeats endlessly thereafter.

Players had a typical Vulcan weapon that could be upgraded three times in order for the shot pattern to widen. Players also had an unlimited amount of ground force bombs that would increase in firing speed with the Vulcan. The player's bomb weapon was a weapon called "The Forcer" that fired a large fireball straight forward.

While the arcade original featured a second player to join in, the 2-player addition was removed from the Mega Drive port.

Bosses
Stage 1: A plane similar to The Me-363

Stage 2: A Japanese I-400 class Submarine

Stage 3: Japanese Captured Avro Lancaster

Stage 4: A German Captured M3 Lee

Stage 5: 3 Messerschmitt Me 264 (1 Black and 2 Brown)

Stage 6: Maus

Stage 7: Yamato

Stage 8: Bosses from Stage 1,3,4,5 and 6

Reception 
In Japan, Game Machine listed USAAF Mustang on their August 1, 1990 issue as being the sixteenth most-successful table arcade unit of the month.

Legacy
A bootleg version of the game uses music from Seibu Kaihatsu's Raiden.

References

External links
USAAF Mustang at Arcade History

Arcade video games
1990 video games
1991 video games
NMK (company) games
Sega Genesis games
Horizontally scrolling shooters
UPL Co., Ltd games
Video games developed in Japan
World War II video games
Multiplayer and single-player video games